Megamorphs #2: In the Time of Dinosaurs is the second book in the Megamorphs series, a set of companion books to the Animorphs series. With respect to continuity, it takes place between book #18, The Decision and book #19, The Departure. The Megamorphs books are narrated by all six members of the Animorphs, in turns, but there is no specific order, unlike the order of narration in the regular series.

Plot summary
When Marco sees a news report about a downed nuclear submarine, he and the other Animorphs set out to find it in dolphin morphs. When the warheads in the submarine detonate, however, the group finds themselves transported through time by a Sario rip, to the era of dinosaurs (the Late Cretaceous period, to be exact). Rachel and Tobias are eaten by a Kronosaurus and believed dead by the other Animorphs. The other Animorphs make their way to land, where they encounter a number of dinosaurs, including the Tyrannosaurus rex, which attempts to eat Jake. Jake morphs while inside the beast, injuring it and causing it to spit him out, and die but not before the other three Animorphs acquire it.

Tobias and Rachel, meanwhile had escaped from the Kronosaurus, and make their own way to land. Tobias' wing has been broken and was unable to be healed by morphing, most likely as a result of the time travel. The two of them have a run-in with a pack of Deinonychus, but both manage to acquire the pack's leader and escape. Later they encountered by a vicious antlike alien race known as the Nesk, who attempt to kill Rachel and Tobias.

The six Animorphs find themselves reunited above a large canyon on a force field with an artificial city at its bottom. After investigating it, they are welcomed by an alien race known as the Mercora, who had fled their own planet which was destroyed and intend on making Earth their new home. However, they are at war with the Nesk, and do not have the technology to help the Animorphs return to their own time. The Nesk, however, do—so the Animorphs storm the Nesk's camp in order to steal a warhead to recreate the explosion that sent them into the past. The Nesk angrily flee Earth, but divert the path of a nearby comet towards the planet. The Mercora respectfully ask the Animorphs to surrender their warhead, thinking they can use it to dissolve the comet, and Tobias agrees to let them have it. However, realizing that the Mercora must have died in the explosion as they are not a current part of Earth and that the comet will cause the Cretaceous–Paleogene extinction event, he tells Ax to render it useless. The Animorphs escape back into the ocean, and the force of the comet propels them back to their own time. They are unable to use their dinosaur morphs following this book.

Morphs

* unusable: Sario Rip morph

Animorphs books
Children's novels about dinosaurs
Novels set in prehistory
Novels about time travel
1998 science fiction novels
Novels about impact events
1998 American novels
Novels about ancient astronauts
Novels with multiple narrators